Eltham railway station is in the Well Hall area of Eltham, South East London, within the Royal Borough of Greenwich. It is in Travelcard Zone 4.

The station is operated by Southeastern. The station has two platforms: platform 1 for services to Central London and platform 2 for Dartford and Barnehurst.

History
Before 1985, there were two railway stations in Eltham on the Bexleyheath line.

It was one of five stations with wooden buildings and was constructed on the west side of the main road, In 1932 the Well Hall buildings were rebuilt.

Eltham Park station, which opened 1 May 1908, was about  further east of the current station with its main entrance adjacent to the London-bound platform, and footpaths to Westmount Road and Glenesk Road. An additional footpath linking the country-bound platform with Westmount Road was available at peak times.

Both stations were closed and replaced by the current station which was opened by British Rail on 17 March 1985 when a new section of the A2,  the Rochester Way Relief Road, was opened. A bus station that was built on a raft above the A2 was opened at the same time.

The platforms and buildings of the abandoned Eltham Park station still exist, but there is no trace of Eltham Well Hall station, the site of which is west of Well Hall Road where the A2 road passes under the railway.

Accidents
On 11 June 1972, a train derailed near Eltham Well Hall station, when the driver went round a sharp curve too fast. The driver and five passengers were killed, plus 126 people injured; an investigation revealed the driver was drunk.

Location
The station is located on Well Hall Road,  from Eltham High Street.

Buses
Eltham station is served by several Transport for London bus routes, the 132, 161, 162, 233, 286 and 314 in the adjoining Eltham bus station. These buses carry passengers from the station to Bexley, Bromley, Blackfen, Chislehurst, Greenwich, Mottingham, New Addington, New Eltham, Sidcup, Swanley and Woolwich.

Services 

The typical off-peak service in trains per hour is:
 2 tph to 
 2 tph to London Cannon Street
 2 tph to 

During the peak hours, the station is served by an additional half-hourly service between Dartford and London Charing Cross.

References

External links 

  
 Kent Rail article on Eltham Park station

Railway stations in Great Britain opened in 1895
Railway stations in the Royal Borough of Greenwich
Railway stations opened by British Rail
Railway stations in Great Britain closed in 1985
Railway stations in Great Britain opened in 1985
Railway stations served by Southeastern
Railway station
1895 establishments in England